Rorippa amphibia is a plant species in the genus Rorippa. It is called great yellowcress. The flowers are visited by many types of insects, and can be characterized by a generalized pollination syndrome.

References

amphibia